Sandhya Mohan is a director, who mostly works in the Malayalam film industry. He is known for his comedy genre movies such as My Dear Karadi and Kilukkam Kilukilukkam.

Career
Sandhya Mohan's debut movie was Ilanjippookkal, which was released in 1986. In 1987, he directed and co-wrote the movie Onnaam Maanam Poomaanam. His movies Hitler Brothers and Amma Ammaayiyamma were comedy movies.

Mr. Marumakan, a comedy-drama film, starring  Dileep, brought recognition to Mohan, and assisted him with plans to make Central Jayile Pretham, starring Indian actress Tamannaah.

Filmography

References

Malayalam film directors
Indian film directors
Year of birth missing (living people)
Living people